Richardsia is a genus of flies belonging to the family Lesser Dung flies.

Species
Richardsia mongolica Papp, 1973 Mongolia

References

Sphaeroceridae
Sphaeroceroidea genera
Diptera of Asia